Jane Seymour (died 1537) was the queen consort of England, third wife of Henry VIII and mother of Edward VI.

Jane Seymour may also refer to:

 Lady Jane Seymour (c. 1541–1561), niece of the above, writer
 Lady Jane Seymour (c. 1637–1679), daughter of William Seymour, 2nd Duke of Somerset and wife of Charles Boyle, 3rd Viscount Dungarvan
 Jane Seymour (actress) (born 1951), English actress and writer
 Jane Seymour (Canadian actress) (1893–1956), Canadian-American actress
 Jane Georgiana Seymour, Duchess of Somerset (1809–1884)